This is a list of available software and hardware tools that are designed for or are particularly suited to various kinds of security assessment and security testing.

Operating systems and tool suites 
Several operating systems and tool suites provide bundles of tools useful for various types of security assessment.

Operating system distributions 
 Kali Linux (formerly BackTrack), a penetration-test-focused Linux distribution based on Debian
 Pentoo, a penetration-test-focused Linux distribution based on Gentoo
 ParrotOS, a Linux distro focused on penetration testing, forensics, and online anonymity.

Tools

External links 
 SecTools.org: Top 125 Network Security Tools – a list of security tools suggested by a community

Computer security
Security assessment tools